Lincoln most commonly refers to:

 Abraham Lincoln (1809–1865), the sixteenth president of the United States
 Lincoln, England, cathedral city and county town of Lincolnshire, England
 Lincoln, Nebraska, the capital of Nebraska, U.S.
 Lincoln (name), a surname and given name
 Lincoln Motor Company, a Ford brand

Lincoln may also refer to:

Places

Canada 
 Lincoln, Alberta
 Lincoln, New Brunswick
 Lincoln Parish, New Brunswick
 Lincoln, Ontario
 Lincoln (electoral district) (former), Ontario
 Lincoln (provincial electoral district) (former), Ontario

United Kingdom 
 Lincoln, England
 Lincoln (UK Parliament constituency)

United States 
 Lincoln, Alabama
 Lincoln, Arkansas
 Lincoln, California, in Placer County
 Lincoln, former name of Clinton, California, in Amador County
 Lincoln, Delaware
 Lincoln, Idaho
 Lincoln, Illinois
 Lincoln, Indiana
 Lincoln, Iowa
 Lincoln Center, Kansas
 Lincoln Parish, Louisiana
 Lincoln, Maine, a New England town
 Lincoln (CDP), Maine, the primary village in the town
 Lincoln Plantation, Maine
 Lincoln, Massachusetts
 Lincoln, Michigan, a village in Alcona County
 Lincoln, Washtenaw County, Michigan, an unincorporated community
 Lincoln, Missouri
 Lincoln, Minnesota
 Lincoln, Montana
 Lincoln, Nebraska, capital of the state
 Lincoln, New Hampshire
 Lincoln (CDP), New Hampshire, the main village in the town
 Lincoln, Gloucester County, New Jersey
 Lincoln, New Mexico
 Lincoln, New York
 Lincoln, North Dakota
 Lincoln, Jackson County, Oregon
 Lincoln, Pennsylvania
 Lincoln, Rhode Island
 Lincoln, Texas
 Lincoln, Vermont
 Lincoln, Virginia
 Lincoln, Washington
 Lincoln, West Virginia
 Lincoln, Adams County, Wisconsin, a town
 Lincoln, Bayfield County, Wisconsin, a town
 Lincoln, Buffalo County, Wisconsin, a town
 Lincoln, Burnett County, Wisconsin, a town
 Lincoln, Eau Claire County, Wisconsin, a town
 Lincoln, Forest County, Wisconsin, a town
 Lincoln, Kewaunee County, Wisconsin, a town
 Lincoln (community), Wisconsin, Kewaunee County town
 Lincoln, Monroe County, Wisconsin, a town
 Lincoln, Polk County, Wisconsin, a town
 Lincoln, Trempealeau County, Wisconsin, a town
 Lincoln, Vilas County, Wisconsin, a town
 Lincoln, Wood County, Wisconsin, a town
 Mount Lincoln (disambiguation), various mountains

Proposed states
 Lincoln (proposed Northwestern state)
 Lincoln (proposed Southern state)

Elsewhere 
 Lincoln, Buenos Aires, Argentina
 Lincoln Partido, Buenos Aires Province, Argentina, a partido
 Lincoln, Tasmania, Australia
 Motu One (Marquesas Islands) or Lincoln, French Polynesia
 Lincoln, New Zealand, in the Canterbury Region
 Lincoln (New Zealand electorate) (former), Canterbury
 Lincoln, Auckland, New Zealand

Arts, entertainment and media

Music
 Lincoln Records, an American record label in the 1920s
 Lincoln (album), a 1988 album by They Might Be Giants
 Lincoln (band), an American alternative rock band of the late 1990s

Television
 Lincoln or Carl Sandburg's Lincoln, a 1974 miniseries with Hal Holbrook
 Lincoln (miniseries), a 1988 American TV miniseries starring Sam Waterston
 Lincoln (TV series), a 2005–2013 Japanese variety television show

Other uses in art, entertainment, and media
 Lincoln (play), a 1906 Broadway play by Benjamin Chapin
 Lincoln (novel), a 1984 novel by Gore Vidal
 Lincoln Island, a fictional island in Jules Verne's novel The Mysterious Island
 Lincoln (film), a 2012 film by Steven Spielberg
 Lincoln, one of the Grounders in The 100 TV series

Businesses and brands
 Lincoln Electric, an American company
 Lincoln International, an investment banking firm
 Lincoln Logs, a children's toy
 Lincoln Motor Car Works, making cars sold exclusively by Sears Roebuck 1908–1912
 Lincoln Motor Company, a Ford brand
 Lincoln National Corporation, an insurance company
 Lincoln Snacks Company
 Lincoln (surveillance), a brand of electronic data interception products

Educational institutions
 Lincoln Academy (disambiguation)
 Lincoln Christ's Hospital School, Lincolnshire
 Lincoln College (disambiguation)
 Lincoln Elementary School (disambiguation)
 Lincoln Group of Schools, U.S
 Lincoln High School (disambiguation)
 Lincoln School (disambiguation)
 Lincoln Tech, a group of schools in New Jersey, US
 Lincoln University (disambiguation)
 Old Lincoln High School, Tallahassee, Florida, US
 University of Lincoln, UK

Military
 Avro Lincoln, a Second World War RAF bomber
 HMS Lincoln, several Royal Navy warships
 USS Abraham Lincoln, two US Navy vessels and several fictitious vessels

Sports
 Lincoln City F.C., an English football club
 Lincoln Red Imps F.C., a semi-professional football club of Gibraltar
 Lincoln (footballer, born 1979), Brazilian midfielder Lincoln Cássio de Souza Soares
 Lincoln (footballer, born 1996), Brazilian defender Lincoln Fernando Rocha da Silva
 Lincoln (footballer, born 1998), Brazilian midfielder Lincoln Henrique Oliveira dos Santos
 Lincoln (footballer, born 2000), Brazilian forward Lincoln Corrêa dos Santos

Transport

Rail stations 
 Lincoln station (Illinois), an Amtrak station in Lincoln, Illinois, United States
 Lincoln station (MBTA), Lincoln, Massachusetts, United States
 Lincoln station (Nebraska), an Amtrak station in Lincoln, Nebraska, United States
 Lincoln station (Nebraska, 1926–2012), Lincoln, Nebraska, United States
 Lincoln station (RTD), a transit station in Lone Tree, Colorado, United States
 Lincoln station (SkyTrain), Coquitlam, British Columbia, Canada
 Lincoln railway station, Lincoln, England
 Lincoln St Marks railway station, a closed station in Lincoln, England

Roadways
 Lincoln Highway, South Australia
 Lincoln Highway, US
 Lincoln Highway (Delaware)
 Lincoln Highway (Omaha)
 Lincoln Highway in Greene County, Iowa
 Lincoln Tunnel, between New Jersey and New York
 Lincoln Drive in Philadelphia

Other transport 
 Lincoln (1914 automobile), built by the Lincoln Motor Car Company

Other uses 
 Lincoln Temple United Church of Christ, a church in Washington, D.C., US
 Lincoln (tree), a sequoia in Giant Forest, California
 Lincoln sheep
 Lincoln (grape) or Catawba grape
 Lincoln biscuit
 Lincoln cent, U.S. coinage
 Lincoln green, a dyed woollen cloth
 Lincoln Way (San Francisco)

See also 
 Camp Lincoln (disambiguation)
 Lincoln Bridge (disambiguation)
 Lincoln Cemetery (disambiguation)
 Lincoln Center (disambiguation)
 Lincoln City (disambiguation)
 Lincoln County (disambiguation)
 Lincoln Green, Leeds
 Lincoln Institute (disambiguation)
 Lincoln Heights (disambiguation)
 Lincoln Park (disambiguation)
 Lincoln Speedway (disambiguation)
 Lincoln Square (disambiguation)
 Lincoln Township (disambiguation)
 Lincoln Village (disambiguation)
 Port Lincoln, South Australia
 Lincoln Logs, a children's toy